H2B histone family, member W, testis-specific is a protein that in humans is encoded by the H2BFWT gene.

Histones are basic nuclear proteins that are responsible for the nucleosome structure of the chromosomal fiber in eukaryotes. Two molecules of each of the four core histones (H2A, H2B, H3, and H4) form an octamer, around which approximately 146 bp of DNA is wrapped in repeating units, called nucleosomes. The linker histone, H1, interacts with linker DNA between nucleosomes and functions in the compaction of chromatin into higher order structures. This gene encodes a member of the H2B histone family that is specifically expressed in sperm nuclei. A polymorphism in the 5' UTR of this gene is associated with male infertility.[provided by RefSeq, Jan 2010].

References

Further reading